Pseudozaena is a genus of beetles in the family Carabidae, containing the following species:

 Pseudozaena orientalis Klug, 1834
 Pseudozaena tricostata (Montrouzier, 1855)

References

Paussinae